The ThinkPad X series is a line of laptop computers and convertible tablets produced by Lenovo with less power than its other counterparts. It was initially produced by IBM until 2005.

IBM announced the ThinkPad X series (initially the X20) in September 2000 with the intention of providing "workers on the move with a better experience in extra-thin and extra-light mobile computing." The ThinkPad X series replaced both the 240 and 570 series during IBM's transition from numbered to letter series during the early 2000s. The first X Series laptops were "slimmer than a deck of cards" and "lighter than a half-gallon of milk", despite the presence of a 12.1-inch Thin-film transistor (TFT LCD) display. These design values—thin and light—continued to be integral to the ThinkPad X-series laptops' design and marketing, even after the purchase of IBM's Personal Computing Division by Lenovo. The first X Series ThinkPad released by Lenovo was the X41 in 2005.

The ThinkPad X-series laptops from Lenovo were described by Trusted Reviews as "combining an ultraportable's weight and form factor with a durable design." The X-series laptop styles include traditional ultraportables, as well as convertible tablet designs. According to Lenovo, the ThinkPad X-series laptops include low power processors, offer long battery life, and several durability features such as a Roll Cage (Magnesium Frame around the Display), magnesium alloy covers, and a spill-resistant keyboard but currently lacks a replaceable battery and upgradable RAM slots.

IBM-branded models

2000

X20

The X20 was the first in IBM/Lenovo's long-standing X-series ultraportable line; the Celeron-based configurations had a thinner case.
 Processor: Intel Coppermine Mobile, Celeron (500MHz), or Pentium III (600MHz)
 Memory: 64128MiB, maximum of 320MiB (1 slot, 64MiB soldered) SDR
 Storage: IDE, 10 or 20GB
 Display:  SVGA or XGA CCFL-backlit TN LCD
 Dimensions: 279 × 227 × 2530mm (or 2428mm with Celeron CPU)

2001

X21
Same specifications as the X20, except an optional 600 or 700MHz processor and more onboard RAM could be ordered.

X22
All new internal design, slim-version dropped, SVGA screen option dropped, Tualatin CPUs, faster (Radeon 7000 8MiB) GPU, Communications Daughter Card/CDC slot, optional FireWire and/or WiFi on some models, 133MHz FSB, maximum RAM increased to 640MiB.
 Processor: Intel Pentium III Mobile (733 or 800MHz)
 Memory: 128, 256, up to 640MiB (1 slot, 128MiB soldered) SDR; 8-chip 512MiB or 4-chip 128MiB modules only.
 Storage: IDE, 10 or 20GB
 Display:  XGA CCFL-backlit TN LCD
 Dimensions: 279 × 227 × 2530mm
 Mass/Weight:  (with standard battery)

2002

X23
Same as the X22 but with faster processors (800 or 866MHz), bigger hard drives up to 30GB, Bluetooth, and the IBM Security Sub System on selected models.

X24
Same as the X23 with even faster processors: 1.06 to 1.13GHz.

X30
Full-powered successor to the X2x line with a completely redesigned case. However, they shared much of the technology. 830MG chipset with Intel Extreme Graphics GPU. Maximum of 1GiB RAM, thanks to two RAM slots. FireWire was now standard on all models. Up to 60GB hard drives were available, and additional secondary "Extended Life Battery" could be purchased.

 Processor: Intel Pentium III Mobile (1.06 or 1.2GHz)
 Memory: 128, 256, or 512MiB DDR (up to 1024MiB, 2 slots)
 Storage: IDE, 15, 20, 30, 40, 48 or 60GB
 Display:  XGA CCFL-backlit TN LCD
 Dimensions: 273 × 223 × 2530mm
 Mass/Weight:  (with standard battery)

2003

X31
X30 updated to the Intel Centrino platform, Pentium M CPUs, faster RAM (DDR PC2100), better GPU (ATI Radeon 7000) and more VRAM (16MiB), USB2.0, 2nd USB port on the left side, Gigabit LAN introduced on some models, IBM Security Sub System on some models.
 Processor: Intel Pentium M (Banias), L2-Cache: 1MiB, TDP: 2224.5W, 400MHz FSB
 1.3GHz, 1.4GHz, 1.5GHz, 1.6GHz, or 1.7GHz
 Memory: 256512MiB DDR (up to 2048MiB, 2 slots)
 Storage: IDE 2.5";
 Models with 4200RPM drives and capacities of 20, 30, 40, or 60GB
 Models with 5400RPM drives and capacities of 40, 60, or 80GB
 Display:  XGA CCFL-backlit TN LCD
 Dimensions: 273 × 223 × 30.2mm
 Mass/Weight:  (with standard battery)

X40

The first model in a new "Thin and Light" sub-line. Specifications:
 Processor: Intel Pentium M 1.0, 1.2, or 1.3GHz (Banias) or 1.1, 1.2, 1.4, 1.5, or 1.6GHz (Dothan)
 Memory: 2561,536MiB DDR (256 or 512MiB soldered, 1 slot)
 Storage: IDE 1.8", 20 or 40GB
 Display:  XGA CCFL-backlit TN LCD
 Dimensions: 268mm × 211mm × 2127mm
 Mass/Weight:

2005

X41, X41 Tablet
Three years after the release of the X30, upon acquiring the ThinkPad division, Lenovo released the ThinkPad X41 ultraportable laptop and the ThinkPad X41 tablet. The X41 tablet was convertible, with the capacity to function as a tablet PC and an ultraportable laptop.

X32

The X32 was introduced in 2005. The numbering system was irregular, as it was actually introduced after the X40, but using the older X3x chassis design. It was also more powerful than the X40 and X41 units, due to the use of faster full-voltage Dothan processors and standard 2.5-inch 5400/7200RPM hard drives. It was a very short-lived model, discontinued within months of introduction. On this model, IBM included Gigabit LAN and the Security Sub System on all models. The X32 and X41 are two of the last IBM-designed ThinkPads before Lenovo took over. The X41 tablet was designed by Lenovo.

2006
The X-series laptops released in 2006 by Lenovo were the X60, X60s, and X60 tablets.

X60 and X60s

The X60 and X60s slimline differed primarily by their processors: the X60s had a low voltage processor, while the X60 did not. This gave the X60s a lower active temperature and longer battery life in exchange for reduced performance. The X60s also had a smaller heatsink and a slightly thinner case with a different battery form factor, although it could use standard X60 batteries with a plastic adapter.

In its review of the ThinkPad X60/X60s, Notebook Review called the laptop, "Hands down the best performing ultraportable on the market", while raising issues about the design and the lack of an optical drive.

The two laptops were available in a variety of configurations. Later X60 models used 64-bit Core 2 Duo CPUs, and some X60s were available with a lightweight LCD panel. Typical specifications of the laptops are provided below:
 Processor:
 Intel Core Solo T1300 (1.6GHz), Core Duo T2300E, T2400, T2500 (1.662.0GHz) or Core 2 Duo T5500, T5600, T7200 (1.662.0GHz)  X60
 Intel Core Duo L2300, L2400, L2500 (1.501.83GHz), or Core 2 Duo L7400 (1.50GHz)  X60s
 Chipset: Intel 945GM
 Memory: up to 3.2GiB DDR2 (2 slots, fits 4GiB, but chipset limit is 3.2GiB)
 Graphics: Intel GMA 950
 Storage: 1 × 2.5" SATA 1.5Gbit/s (80GB 5400RPM)
 Display:   CCFL-backlit TN LCD
 Operating System: Microsoft Windows XP Professional

X60 Tablet
The ThinkPad X60 tablet was praised by reviewers. LAPTOP Magazine said the ThinkPad X60 tablet "raises the bar for business-class convertibles". The most significant issue raised was the low capacity 4-cell battery, which provided a battery life of two hours.

Lenovo-branded models

2007
The X Series laptops released by Lenovo in 2007 were the X61, the X61s, and the X61 tablet.

X61 and X61s

The X61 received mixed user reviews on CNET, with some users reporting display problems and delivery delays, while others praised the laptop for performance and portability.

Reviewers, however, praised the ultraportable. Notebook Review called it an "extremely fast ultraportable". However, they criticized the display colors and viewing angles. They also pointed out that the palm rest was prone to heating up because of the wireless networking card underneath it.

The X61s was lauded for its excellent build quality, performance, and long battery life. The battery was an improvement over the X41. The model is one of the last to feature a 43 aspect ratio display.

Some X60s models shipped with the Intel Core 2 Duo L7300 clocked at 1.40GHz or the L7700 clocked at 1.80GHz. As of 2018, it was still possible to purchase new batteries and spare parts for these laptops from a few online retailers.

X61 Tablet

The ThinkPad X61 tablet also received positive reviews, with IT Reviews saying that "the build quality and engineering are second to none and this shines through with the tablet features which have been executed with something close to genius". However, the high price tag and relatively inadequate performance were criticized by the reviewer.

tabletPC Review acknowledged the sturdiness of the X61 tablet, the high battery life, and the quality of the pen. The features that met with disfavor were the lack of a widescreen, display brightness and colors, and the lack of an optical drive—although the reviewer admitted that the absence helps reduce weight.

2008

The laptops released in the X series in 2008 followed the new naming conventions established by Lenovo. The X Series laptops released by Lenovo in 2008 were X200, X200 tablet and X300.

X200 and X200s

The ThinkPad X200 was released on 15 July 2008. This was one of the last models of the X-Series able to run Libreboot, a Free Software BIOS replacement.

Lenovo released X200s on 23 September 2008. It differed from the standard X200 in being lighter, having longer battery life, and running more quietly due to an "owl fan" design for cooling taken from the X300. The X200s was available with more than half a dozen different CPUs and three screen options; the top of the range was a WXGA+ LED-Backlit TN Panel.

The X200s features cooler components (made possible with the fan design modeled on owl-wings). However, both laptops did not have a touchpad (only the TrackPoint), no HDMI, DVI, or DisplayPort, and no built-in optical drive. The X200 series included tablet PC models, designated by the usage of the "t" suffix, primarily the X230t.

X200 Tablet
Lenovo released X200 tablet on 9 September 2008. Like other tablet-designated models this added a convertible screen assembly containing a touch digitizer with pen and buttons on the screen front for operating the device without access to keyboard and buttons in converted mode.

X300 and X301

Codenamed "Kodachi", with X300 was released on 26 February 2008. It is distinguished from other ultraportable laptops by its use of LED backlighting, removable battery, solid-state drive, and integrated DVD burner. The ThinkPad X300 used a small form factor Intel GS965 chipset (instead of the standard GM965 chipset), along with the Intel Core 2 Duo L7100 low-voltage CPU (with 12W Thermal design power (TDP). Its successor, the ThinkPad X301 uses the Intel Centrino 2 mobile platform with GS45 chipset, and an ultra-low-voltage (ULV) CPU. It also integrates GPS, WWAN, and a webcam in the top lid.

The X300's original internal codename was "Razor", after the then-popular Motorola Razr flip phone. Lenovo noticed that three technologies were converging that would make it possible to build a very thin, light, and fast ThinkPad. The first was solid-state storage, which would replace mechanical hard drives. The second was light-emitting diode (LED) backlighting for flat-panel displays which would improve battery life and image quality. The third was ultrathin optical drives just 7mm thick, compared to 9.5mm and 12.7mm used by previous ThinkPads. The Razor concept was eventually merged with the Bento-Fly project and renamed Kodachi.

The price at the time of the review by Notebook Review was extremely high, and indicated to be out of range for all but corporate users. LAPTOP Magazine awarded the X300 laptop a score of 4.5 stars, among the highest for a ThinkPad X-series laptop.

This laptop was less than an inch thick, making it the thinnest ThinkPad available at the time. The X300 laptop offered a quick boot with SSD. It also offered a built-in optical drive, uncommon in thin and light notebooks. However, the laptop did not include an SD card reader, had no expansion dock capability, and no ExpressCard or PC Card slot.

2010
The X-series laptops released in 2010 from Lenovo were the X100e, X201, X201s, and X201 tablet.

X100e and Mini 10

The ThinkPad X100e was released in 2010, with Engadget calling the laptop "the perfect solution between a netbook and a larger 13- or 14-inch ULV ultraportable". Available in two colors (heatwave red and the traditional ThinkPad matte black) the design was compared to that of the Edge series which deviated from traditional ThinkPad design. The X100e, however, despite the choice of colors, retained the "angular edges and boxy build" which "scream traditional ThinkPad design".

The specifications of the X100e laptop are given below:
 Processor: 1.6GHz AMD Athlon Neo Single-Core MV-40
 Memory: Up to 4GiB 667MT/s DDR2 (2 slots) with 2GiB fitted as standard
 Graphics: ATI Radeon 3200
 Display:   (169) LED-backlit TN LCD
 Storage: 1 × SATA 3Gbit/s (250GB 5400RPM) 
 0.3Mpx webcam, 4-in-1 card reader
 Battery: 6-cell
 Dimensions: 
 Mass/Weight:  with a 6-cell battery
 Operating System: Microsoft Windows 7 Professional 32-bit

A modified and re-branded low-cost version of the Lenovo X100e, named the Mini 10 was issued to all year 9 students in NSW Australia at the start of 2010. They featured an Intel Atom N450 (1.66 GHz) processor, 160 GB HDD, 2 GiB RAM, a 10-inch 1024×600 Screen (fitted in a 11.6-inch frame), 0.3MP Webcam and Windows 7 Enterprise.

X201, X201i and X201s
The main 12-inch line-up only received an internal hardware update and a new palmrest with a touchpad. 

The X201i model is a version of the regular X201 with a Core i3 CPU.

X201 Tablet
Notebook Review had similar views about the X201 tablet in terms of both performance and battery life while indicating the display was superior to that of the X201 or X201s.

2011
The ThinkPad X-series laptops released in 2011 by Lenovo were the X120e, X220, X220i, X220 tablet and X1.

In some models the keyboard is significantly changed: The extra buttons for mute, volume up, and volume down are moved under Fn+Fxx keys. The shape of the keys and the distance between keys are changed (Chiclet or Island-style keyboard). There is a global trend that the keys are getting more flat, and the way of movement is getting shorter. The last and most popular models with a really traditional keyboard were X61, X200, X201 (sleeper ThinkPad builders are using these models to put a custom motherboard into the "vintage" case, see: X62, X210).  This year X220 had an almost traditional keyboard, but some keys (ins, del) changed their positions and size.

X120e, X121e

The ThinkPad X120e was released in March 2011. The laptop won Best Affordable Business Ultraportable at CES 2011. The laptop's specifications are given below.
 Battery: 7.5 hours

X220
The ThinkPad X220 was released in April 2011 with a new thinner, latchless case and a 16:9 screen. LAPTOP Magazine received the X220 positively. It was praised for its battery life, performance, low weight, display, keyboard, and significantly improved temperature control. However, the web camera did not receive favor—while images were crisp and clear, colors were reported to be muted.

Engadget said the "all-too-familiar ThinkPad can deceive you with its boring business looks, but it's arguably one of the best laptops we've ever tested". Notebook Review was of the same opinion, stating that the "ThinkPad X220 is quite simply the best 12-inch business notebook we've reviewed so far."

The laptop's specifications are given below:
 Processor: Intel Sandy Bridge, up to a Core i7-2640M
 Memory: Up to 8GiB DDR3 1333MT/s (unofficially up to 16GiB and 1866MT/s)
 Graphics: Intel HD Graphics 3000
 Display:   (169) LED-backlit TN or IPS LCD. The X220 was the first non-tablet X series to have an IPS screen option from the factory.
Storage: 1 × SATA 6Gbit/s, 1 × mSATA 3Gbit/s
 Battery: Up to 9 hours with a 6-cell battery and up to 15 hours with a 9-cell battery. This battery life can be increased to 23 hours with a 9-cell battery and an external battery pack.
 Mass/Weight: Less than 
 Dimensions: 

The X220i uses the same motherboard and chipset as the standard X220 but has a less powerful Intel Core i3 processor, compared to the i5 and i7 options available for the X220. As another cost-reducing measure, the X220i was not offered with an IPS display option.

X220 Tablet
The X220 tablet was also released in April 2011. It offered the same specifications as the X220 laptop in terms of processor, graphics, and RAM. The battery life on the X220 tablet was up to nine hours with a 6-cell battery and up to 18 hours with an external battery pack and a 6-cell battery. The starting weight of the tablet was 3.88 lbs.

X1

An addition to the lightweight X series, weighing between 1.36 kg to 1.72 kg depending on configuration. It was the thinnest ThinkPad laptop to date at 16.5 (front) and 21.5 mm (rear). The base configuration uses an Intel Sandy Bridge 2.5 GHz Core i5-2520M (up to 3.20 GHz) with 4 GiB of RAM (up to 8 GiB), SATA SSD or hard drive, Intel Integrated HD Graphics, USB 3.0, backlit keyboard, 802.11 b/g/n WiFi and an average of eight hours of battery life. The battery is internal and not removable, and there is no optical drive.

The ThinkPad X1 laptop was released by Lenovo in May 2011. Notebook Review offered a positive opinion of the ThinkPad X1, saying that it was, "A powerful notebook that combines the durability and features of a business-class ThinkPad with the style of a consumer laptop." A 13.3-inch X1 ThinkPad was announced to be available in the UK on June 7, 2011.

The specifications of the ThinkPad X1 laptop are given below:
 Processor: Up to Intel Core i7-2620M (2× 2.70GHz, 4MiB L3)
 Memory: Up to 8GiB DDR3 1333MT/s (1 slot)
 Graphics: Intel HD Graphics 3000
 Storage: 1 × SATA 6Gbit/s (320GB 7200RPM HDD, or an SSD, ranging from 128GiB to 160GB)
 Battery: Up to 5.2 hours. This could be extended further to 10 hours with a slice battery.
 Mass/Weight: Starting at 
 Dimensions:

2012 
The ThinkPad X-series laptops released in 2012 by Lenovo were the X1 Carbon, X131e, X230 and X230t (tablet).

In the T, W, and L series the models ThinkPad T430, T430s, T530, W530, L430 and L530 were also released.

The Ins, or Insert key, was removed as an individual key, and instead changed as a function of the End key. To use the Insert key's functionality, one would now need to use the key combo Fn-End, completely eradicating the ability to use Ctrl-Ins - Shift-Ins as an alternative way to use copy and paste.

X130e, X131e
The X131e is a laptop designed for the education market and comes in three versions: ChromeOS, Windows and DOS. It has a durable case fitted with rubber bumpers and thickened plastic case components to improve its durability. The display is an  panel with a  resolution and an anti-glare coating. It can be customized with various colors, school logos, and asset tagging. The X131e comes in several processor versions: Intel's Celeron/Core i3 and AMD's E1/E2. All models are basically the same as the X130e, with some including SIM card slots for cellular network access and some including Wireless WAN (WWAN) cards.

A special edition laptop was provided for Australian Year 9 students as part of the Digital Education Revolution (DER) program in 2012.

Hardware specifications:
 Processor: Intel Celeron 857 (1.2GHz dual-core)
 Memory: 4GiB DDR3
 Storage: 320GB SATA HDD, with additional SD-card slot
 Display:   (169) LED-backlit TN LCD
 Integrated 0.3Mpx camera
 Integrated Wi-Fi and Bluetooth
 Mass/Weight:  with 6-cell battery

X230

The ThinkPad X230 announced on 15 May 2012 replaced the earlier X220. The X230 uses the same chassis but introduced a new chiclet-style, 6-row keyboard replacing the classic 7-row keyboard style, Ivy Bridge processor, and for the first time in the X-series—USB 3.0. The new keyboard design became a controversial topic in the ThinkPad community along with the locked-down BIOS that discouraged third-party components including batteries or WLAN cards. The Ivy Bridge processors brought performance improvements compared to the X220, and the integrated Intel HD Graphics 4000 is more than capable of delivering a good gaming experience in 4X or classic RTS games.

The maximum amount of installable memory is 16GiB in two memory slots, allowing for dual-channel RAM. Just like the X220, it is possible to use an mSATA SSD within the second Mini PCI Express slot instead of a WWAN card.

Specifications:
 Processor: Intel 3rd Generation Core i5/i7 (Ivy Bridge) CPU:
 Core i7-3520M (2.9GHz dual-core, 4MB L3 cache)
 Core i5-3360M (2.8GHz dual-core, 3MB L3 cache)
 Core i5-3320M (2.6GHz dual-core, 3MB L3 cache)
 Core i5-3210M (2.5GHz dual-core, 3MB L3 cache)
 Memory: Up to 16GiB DDR3 (1600MT/s, 2 socketed DIMMs)
 Graphics: Intel HD Graphics 4000
 Display:   (169) LED-backlit TN or IPS LCD
 Storage: 1 × SATA 6Gbit/s (320 or 500GB HDD, or 128 or 180GiB SSD), 1 × mSATA 6Gbit/s socket
 720p HD webcam (04f2:b2eb Chicony Electronics Co., Ltd) or 3×3 Antenna Grid

X230i is just an i3-equipped version of a regular X230.

X230s
The X230s is a China-Market only model. More akin to the X240 instead of the X230, it gained many of the design cues later found on the X240 Line, and were equipped with Intel 3rd Gen ULV CPUs.

X230 Tablet
The ThinkPad X230 Tablet was announced on 15 May 2012 and replaced the earlier X220 tablet. The ThinkPad X230t is not compatible with previous series 3 docking stations (4337 and 4338) and is only compatible with the UltraBase series 3 "slice base". The X230t has a touchscreen with stylus support whereas the X230 has no touchscreen. The X230T also has a full size display port whereas the X230 has a mini display port.

X1 Carbon

In early August 2012, Lenovo released the first generation of ThinkPad X1 Carbon announced on 15 May 2012. The X1 Carbon weighs , has a battery life of roughly eight hours, and has a start-up time of less than 20 seconds. The X1 Carbon was first released in China because of the popularity of ThinkPads in that market.

The first X1 Carbon featured only an M.2 SSD instead of a 2.5" hard drive bay. The base model has 4GiB of memory, an Intel Core i5-3317U processor, and a 128GiB SSD. The most expensive model has an Intel Core i7 processor and a 256GiB SSD. The X1 Carbon requires a dongle to connect an ethernet cable, and some models include a 3G cellular modem.

The X1 Carbon weighs  and measures . The X1 Carbon's case is made of light carbon fiber and has a matte black finish. The Carbon is also marketed "as the thinnest 14" ultrabook.

In a review published for CNET, Dan Ackerman wrote, "At first glance, the ThinkPad X1 Carbon looks a lot like other ThinkPads, but in the hand it stands out as very light and portable. The excellent keyboard shows up other ultrabooks, and the rugged build quality is reassuring. With a slightly boosted battery and maybe a lower starting price, this could be a serious contender for my all-around favorite thin laptop."

Peter Bright wrote a disparaging review for Ars Technica. He found the new X1 Carbon with the "Adaptive Keyboard" to be near perfect but unusable because the keyboard was so non-standard when compared with that of a desktop or the older ThinkPad T410s and Lenovo Helix keyboards. As a touch typist, he despaired at the removal of the function keys, and the layout. He cited the repositioning of the Caps Lock key, replacing it with Home/End, and the positioning of the backspace and delete keys.

In November 2012, Lenovo announced a touch-screen variant called the ThinkPad X1 Carbon Touch designed for use with Windows 8. Its display makes use of multi-touch technology that can detect simultaneous inputs from up to ten fingers. On the performance of the X1 Carbon Touch's SSD, Engadget states, "The machine boots into the Start screen in 11 seconds, which is pretty typical for a Windows 8 machine with specs like these. We also found that the solid-state drive delivers equally strong read and write speeds (551MB/s and 518MB/s, respectively), which we noticed the last time we tested an Ultrabook with an Intel SSD."

2013
The ThinkPad X Series laptops released in 2013 by Lenovo were the X131e Chromebook, X240, X140e, and ThinkPad Helix (Convertible tablet).

X131e Chromebook
The Chromebook version of the X131e was released in early 2013. It also has less powerful internals due to it running ChromeOS.

X140e
The X140e is the last ThinkPad with a classic round power plug.

X240 and X240s

The ThinkPad X240 replaced the earlier X230 and X230s. Compared to the X230, the X240 changed from the higher-power Intel Core CPUs labelled as "mobile class", to the lower-power CPUs labelled "ultrabook class". Depending on the CPU model, the change resulted in a 10%–20% reduction in CPU performance compared to the older, but higher power Ivy Bridge generation CPUs. This was the first X-series laptop to forgo the classic TrackPoint buttons in favor of a touchpad that can also be pushed. The X240 reduced the maximum physical memory to 8GiB, with only one memory slot, making dual-channel unavailable (compared to 16GiB dual-channel in two memory slots on the X230), lost the dedicated insert key and volume control keys. The X240 uses the rectangular "slim tip" power plug. X240 has two double batteries. And also the touchpads on the X240 range were emphasized on YouTube channels like Laptop Retrospective as feeling like paper and that's why the X250 touchpads were commonly fitted on X240 models for improved clicking and satisfaction of a good touchpad.

The X240s is a slimmed down and lighter, Asian-market-only version of the X240 with the docking port missing and Power Bridge hot-swappable battery replaced with two internal batteries rated at 23.5Wh each, which by extension removes the option to install larger 6-cell batteries in place of the default 3-cell.

Helix

The ThinkPad Helix was released as an option for corporate IT buyers who were looking for the power of a high-end Ultrabook and the mobility of a tablet. The ThinkPad Helix featured a tablet powered by Ivy Bridge components, a docking keyboard, and a Wacom digitizer stylus.

2015

X250

The ThinkPad X Series laptops released in 2015 by Lenovo were the third-generation X1 Carbon and X250 during the CES congress. The ThinkPad X250 has a Broadwell processor. The X250 saw a return of separate trackpoint buttons; it has only one RAM slot. A touch screen was available for this model. The X250 uses the rectangular power plug.

2016

X260
The ThinkPad X Series laptops were released in 2016 by Lenovo during the CES congress and replaced the earlier ThinkPad X250. The ThinkPad X260 adopts the Skylake processors, adds an additional USB 3.0 port, but USB-C is missing. and replaces the VGA port with an HDMI port in addition to the existing Mini DisplayPort port. Lenovo claims the X260 can achieve battery life of 21.5 hours from a full charge.

2017

X270
The  ThinkPad X270 was announced in December 2016 with TN and IPS displays available in HD and FHD as well as a FHD touch screen option. Lenovo claims the X270 can achieve more than 20 hours of battery life from a full charge. It includes one USB-C port supporting USB 3.1 Gen 1 speed (5Gbit/s) and PD (charging via USB-C), HDMI, two USB Type-A 3.0 ports, one of which is "always on", allowing users to charge items plugged in while the laptop is off or asleep.

A275
The A275 is a version of the X270 with an AMD processor and some other differences.

2018

X280
Lenovo ThinkPad x280 is the first in the X line to feature charging and docking to USB-C Thunderbolt.

Unlike previous models in the series, this has soldered RAM, a non-removable battery, and no built-in RJ45 ethernet port (although one is available via an extension cable). Some users have contended that this eliminates several of the central appeals of the X2* series, and that it effectively represents a replication of Lenovo's existing lines rather than a true continuation of the series.

A285

The A285 is a version of the X280 with an AMD processor. While the ports selection and connectivity look identical, A285 lacks X280's Thunderbolt 3 support.

X380 Yoga

2019

X390
Update of X280 with a same case but with a  screen.

X395
Same as the X390, but it has an AMD processor.

X390 Yoga

2020

 X13 (Intel)
 X13 (AMD)
 X13 Yoga (1st Gen)

See also 
 ThinkPad Yoga series

Notes

References

External links
 ThinkPad X Series

IBM laptops
Lenovo laptops
Subnotebooks
Microsoft Tablet PC
X series
Computer-related introductions in 2000